Mueang Phuket is the capital district (amphoe mueang) of Phuket province, Thailand. Phuket town itself is in the district's northeast.

Geography

The district encompasses the southern part of the island of Phuket. The western and southern coast consists of several heavily used beaches, from the northwest counter-clockwise: Karon, Kata, Kata Noi, Nai Han, Rawai, and Friendship Beach along Chalong Bay. The beaches are separated from each other by rocky capes, most notably Phromthep Cape at the southernmost tip of the island.

History
Originally named Thung Kha (ทุ่งคา), it was renamed Mueang Phuket on 14 November 1938.

Temples

The most important of the 29 Buddhist temples of Phuket is Wat Chalong (วัดฉลอง or, more formally, วัดไชยธาราราม). It is dedicated to two venerated monks, Luang Pho Chaem (หลวงพ่อแช่ม) and Luang Pho Chuang (หลวงพ่อช่วง), who, with their knowledge of herbal medicine, helped those injured in a tin miners rebellion in 1876.

Administration
The district is divided into eight sub-districts (tambons), which are further subdivided into 44 villages (mubans). The town of Phuket has city status (thesaban nakhon) and covers tambons Talad Yai and Talad Nuea; Karon, Ratsada, Rawai, and Wichit have sub-district municipality status (thesaban tambon) and each cover the complete same-named tambon. Chalong and Ko Kaeo have a tambon administrative organizations (TAO).

References

External links

amphoe.com
Wat Chalong Video

Mueang Phuket